The Tariqa Burhāniyya ( Ṭarīqa al burhāniyya al disūqiyyah al shādhliyyah; also written al-Burhāniyya or Burhāniyyah) or Desuqiyya is a Sufi order founded by Sayyidi Abul Hasan ash-Shadhuli and Sayyidi Ibrahim al Disuqi in the 13th century.  The order's full name is Tariqa Burhaniya Disuqiya Shadhuliya, referring to its founders. Burhan-uddin is a surname of Sayyidi Ibrahim al Disuqi and means "evidence of religion".  The order has a registered charity in the UK, Tariqa Burhaniya D'suqiyya Shazuliyya (tbds); Registered Charity Number: 1041647.

Desouki, also known as the Burhani order, was founded by Ibrahim El-Desouki, whose resting place in the Nile delta is a major place of pilgrimage for Sufi Muslims from all over Egypt. Originally from Egypt, there is a significant population of members in Khartoum. During the Ottoman times, this order, along with the other native Egyptian Sufi order, the Badawiyyah order, had several tekkes in Istanbul. These tekkes, along with all others, were closed when Turkey became a republic.

Origins
The order was renewed by the Sudanese Sheikh Mawlana Mohamed Osman Abdu al Burhani (1902–1983). After his death the leadership of the order passed to his son Sheikh Ibrahim as Sheikh Mohamed Osman Abdu al-Burhani. During the leadership of Sheikh Ibrahim the order was spreading also in other parts of the Arab Middle East, especially in Europe, North America ( United States, Canada) and South Asia (Pakistan, India).

Since 2003 the order is under the guidance of his grandson Sheikh Mohamed al Sheikh Ibrahim al Sheikh Mohamed Osman Abdu al-Burhani. The domicile of the European center of the order is located on the edge of the Lüneburg Heath in Germany.

Spiritual line 
Burhaniya is the Sufi order of Sayyidi Ibrahim al Qurashi al Disuqi (13th Century A.D.), the fourth of the great Sufi sheikhs and founders of Sufi orders (aqtab)أقطاب. The spiritual line of the Burhaniya sheikhs traces back to the Islamic Prophet Mohammed. The most important chain links are:

Sayyidi al Sheikh Mohamed Ibrahim Mohamed Osman 
Sayyidi al Sheikh Ibrahim Mohamed Osman
Sayyidi al Sheikh Mohamed Osman Abdu al Burhani
Sayyidi Ahmad Arabi al Sharnubi
Sayyidi Musa Abu al Imran 
Sayyidi Ibrahim al Qurashi al Disuqi 
Sayyidi Abul Hasan al Shaduli 
Sayyidi Abdu al Salam ibn Bashish
Sayyiduna wa Maulana al Imam al Hussain 
Sayyiduna wa Maulana al Imam Ali 
Ziyadatan fi Sharaf al Mustafa

See also

 History of Sufism
 Index of Sufism-related articles
 Muhammad ibn 'Arafa ad-Desouki (prominent late jurist of the Maliki school).
 Ibrahim El-Desouki
 Desouk
 Dessouki
 Desouk SC

References

External links
 Website of Tariqa Burhaniya
 YouTube channel of the Burhaniya Tariqa

Sufi orders